The ethnonym Turks (/Tourkoi, /) has been commonly used by the non-Muslim Balkan peoples to denote all Muslim settlers in the region, regardless of their ethno-linguistic background. The majority of these, however, were indeed ethnic Turks. In the Ottoman Empire, the Islamic faith was the official religion, with Muslims holding different rights than non-Muslims. Non-Muslim (dhimmi) ethno-religious legal groups were identified by different millets ("nations").

Turk was also notably used to denote all groups in the region who had been Islamized during the Ottoman rule, especially Muslim Albanians and Slavic Muslims (mostly Bosniaks). For the Balkan Christians, converting to Islam was synonymous with Turkification, succumbing to "Ottoman rule and embracing the Ottoman way of life," hence "to become a Turk". In South Slavic languages, there are also derivative terms that are more-so seen as offensive towards Bosniaks, such as poturiti, poturčiti and poturica (all essentially meaning "Turk" or "to turkify"). Slavic Muslims follow the Hanafi school of Sunni Islam, the most dominant school in the Ottoman Empire.
Also Orthodox Christian Roma from the Balkans call the Muslim Roma as Xoraxane, the meaning of this word in Balkan Romani language is simple Muslim/Turk.

According to the religious ideology of Christoslavism, coined by Michael Sells, religion played a key role in maintaining alliances and ethnic identification during tumultuous ethnic conflicts in Southeastern Europe for centuries, from the High Middle Ages onward. Sells postulates that there existed a "belief that Slavs are Christian by nature and that any conversion from Christianity is a betrayal of the Slavic race" as seen in Croatian Roman Catholic and Serbian Eastern Orthodox ethnic and nationalist movements. Slavic Muslims were, therefore, not regarded part of their ethnic kinship, as by conversion to Islam, "they have become Turks".

In Greece and in the Greek language, the same belief was held about Greek Muslims, that they had essentially "become Turks", while tourkalvanoi ("Turco-Albanians") became a common term for Muslim Albanians who had been a significant minority in the country. All of these terms are now considered pejorative ethnic slurs in their respective languages as well as by those groups that they refer to.

Following the end of World War I and the dissolution of the Ottoman Empire, all Ottoman Muslims were made part of the modern citizenry or the Turkish nation.

See also
Giaour
 Ottoman wars in Europe

References

Sources

Islam-related slurs
Ethno-cultural designations
Islam in the Ottoman Empire